Wayne Diamond is an American fashion designer, best known for his performance as an exaggerated version of himself in the 2019 Safdie brothers film Uncut Gems.

Biography
Wayne Diamond was born on Long Island, New York, and grew up in Oceanside with three sisters and one brother. His father, Alan, taught accounting at Nassau Community College and Adelphi University. His mother, Marilyn, was a schoolteacher. Diamond attended Oceanside High School in his youth.

He later founded the dress-maker Diamond's Run during the 1970s, based in the New York City Garment District. He designed for the business through the 1980s, until its sale in the 1990s for $110 million. During this time he spent much of his career working in The Hamptons.  Diamond says that he designed every dress Vanna White wore on Wheel of Fortune.

Diamond has been married twice, and he has been married to his second wife for almost four decades. He has four kids, including a daughter named Jamie, a teacher at UPenn. Diamond is Jewish.

He is best known for his performance in the Safdie brothers' 2019 film Uncut Gems as a fictionalised version of himself.

References

Living people
Year of birth missing (living people)